Crețulescu Palace (Palatul Crețulescu in Romanian, alternative spelling "Kretzulescu" or "Krețulescu") is a historic building near the Cișmigiu Gardens on Știrbei Vodă Street nr. 39, in Bucharest, Romania. It was built for the Crețulescu family in 1902–1904 by Romanian architect Petre Antonescu (1873–1965).

The palace was built for Elena Kretzulescu (1857–1930), the daughter of Constantin Kretzulescu (1798–1863) and Maria Filipescu (1835–1878). While she was away in Paris, Barbu Bellu lived for many years in this house.

From 1972 to 2011, the Crețulescu Palace housed the headquarters of UNESCO's European Centre for Higher Education UNESCO-CEPES (known as CEPES after its French name, Centre Europeén pour l'enseignement supérieur).

See also
 Kretzulescu Church

References

External links
 UNESCO-CEPES official site.

Palaces in Bucharest
Historic monuments in Bucharest
Gothic Revival architecture in Romania
1904 establishments in Romania
Houses completed in 1904